Hacı Zeynalabdin (also, Hacı Zeynalabdin Tağiyev, Nasoslu, Nasosnaya, Nasosnyy, and Nassosny) is a village and municipality in Sumqayit, Azerbaijan.  It has a population of 20,929.  The place was named after Zeynalabdin Taghiyev.

References

External links

Populated places in Sumgait